Manchester Place is a light rail station that is currently under construction. It will be part of the Purple Line in Maryland. The station will be located underground in between Wayne Avenue and Plymouth Street.

History 
The Purple Line system is under construction as of 2022 and is scheduled to open in 2026.

Station layout
The station consists of an island platform just east of Wayne Avenue. Access to the station will be made using stairs or elevators.

References

Purple Line (Maryland)
Railway stations scheduled to open in 2026
Railway stations in Montgomery County, Maryland
Railway stations located underground in Maryland
Silver Spring, Maryland (CDP)